Nikkei Internment Memorial Centre is a museum that preserves and interprets one of ten Canadian concentration camps where more than 27,000 Japanese Canadians were incarcerated by the Canadian government during and after World War II (1942 to 1949). The centre was designated a National Historic Site of Canada in 2007.

Description
The museum is open seasonally from 1 May to 30 September. The site consists of five buildings, of which three are original shacks built to house the interned. Many artifacts such as stoves and furnishings are preserved, as are some personal effects of the people displaced. It also features a Japanese garden designed by Roy Sumi, a former supervisor of the Nitobe Memorial Garden at the University of British Columbia.

Affiliations
The Museum is affiliated with the CMA, CHIN, and Virtual Museum of Canada.

References

External links

2007 establishments in British Columbia
Regional District of Central Kootenay
Slocan Valley
Museums in British Columbia
Military and war museums in Canada
National Historic Sites in British Columbia
World War II museums in Canada
Internment of Japanese Canadians
Japanese gardens in Canada
World War II internment camps in Canada